The Ariel-class gunboat was a class of nine 4-gun composite gunboats built for the Royal Navy between 1871 and 1873.  Although most were sold by 1890, one of them survived into the 1920s as a salvage vessel in private ownership.  They were the first class of Royal Navy gunboat built of composite construction, that is, with iron keel, stem and stern posts, and iron framing, but planked with wood.

Design and construction
Designed by Sir Edward Reed, Chief Constructor of the Royal Navy, the Ariel-class gunboats were the first Royal Navy gunboats of composite construction. They were some of the first vessels to be fitted with compound-expansion engines, allowing the Royal Navy to experiment with new engine designs at little risk in small, cheap vessels. They were armed with two  64-pounder (56cwt) muzzle-loading rifles and two  20-pounder Armstrong breech loaders. All 4 guns were mounted on traversing carriages. Some of the class were re-armed in the 1880s with two 5-inch and two 4-inch breech loaders. All the ships of the class carried a three-masted barquentine rig.

Ships

Notes

References

Publications

 
 Ariel
Gunboat classes